Rankin Barn may refer to:

Rebecca Rankin Round Barn, Poling, Indiana
Rankin Octagonal Barn, Silverton, West Virginia

See also
Rankin House (disambiguation)